Phulbari Upazila may refer to:

In Bangladesh:
 Phulbari Upazila, Dinajpur
 Phulbari Upazila, Kurigram
 Fulbaria Upazila, Mymensingh

Elsewhere:
 Phulbari, Mechi, Nepal
 Phulbari, Rapti, Nepal
 Phulbari, Jalpaiguri, West Bengal, India, location of a road border crossing into Bangladesh